The Balkan League was a military alliance against the Ottoman Empire.

The Balkan League may also refer to:

Sport 
 Balkan League (ice hockey), from 1994 to 1997
 Balkan Amateur Hockey League, since 2007
 Balkan International Basketball League

See also 
 Balkan Cup (disambiguation)